Events from the year 1869 in the United States.

Incumbents

Federal Government 
 President: Andrew Johnson (D-Tennessee) (until March 4), Ulysses S. Grant (R-Illinois) (starting March 4)
 Vice President: vacant (until March 4), Schuyler Colfax (R-Indiana) (starting March 4)
 Chief Justice: Salmon P. Chase (Ohio)
 Speaker of the House of Representatives:
 until March 3: Schuyler Colfax (R-Indiana)
 March 3–March 4: Theodore Medad Pomeroy (R-New York)
 starting March 4: James G. Blaine (R-Maine)
 Congress: 40th (until March 4), 41st (starting March 4)

Events

January–March
 January 1 – Sigma Nu, the first anti-hazing honor/social fraternity, is founded, at Virginia Military Institute.
 January 20 – Elizabeth Cady Stanton is the first woman to testify before the United States Congress.
 January 21 – The P.E.O. Sisterhood, a philanthropic educational organization for women, is founded at Iowa Wesleyan College in Mount Pleasant, Iowa.
 February 15 – Charges of treason against Jefferson Davis are dropped.
 March 4 – Ulysses S. Grant is sworn in as the 18th President of the United States, and Schuyler Colfax is sworn in as Vice President of the United States.
 March 9 – Southern Illinois University Carbondale is established by the state legislature as Southern Illinois Normal College.

April–June

 April 6 – The American Museum of Natural History is founded in New York City.
 May 6 – Purdue University is founded in West Lafayette, Indiana.
 May 10 – The "golden spike" is driven marking the completion of the First transcontinental railroad in Promontory, Utah.
 May 15 – Woman's suffrage: In New York, Susan B. Anthony and Elizabeth Cady Stanton form the National Woman Suffrage Association.
 May 26 – Boston University is chartered by the Commonwealth of Massachusetts.
 June 1
 The Cincinnati Red Stockings open the baseball season as the first fully professional baseball team.
 Thomas Edison is granted his first patent for the Electric Vote Recorder.
 June 15 – John Wesley Hyatt patents the first plastic, Celluloid, in Albany, New York.

July–September
 July 4 – World's first rodeo held in Deer Trail, Colorado
 September 15 – Brooklyn Fire Department organized as a professional brigade.
 September 24 – Black Friday: The Fisk-Gould Scandal causes a financial panic in the United States.

October–December

 October 8 – New York Foundling Asylum incorporated.
 October 11 – Gamma Sigma becomes the first high school fraternity in North America at Brockport Normal School, Brockport, New York.
 October 16 – The Tremont House in Boston becomes the first hotel to have indoor plumbing.
 November 6 – The first intercollegiate game of American football is played: Rutgers University defeats Princeton University 6–4 in a college football game.
 December 7 – Outlaw Jesse James commits his first confirmed bank robbery, in Gallatin, Missouri.
 December 10
The first American chapter of Kappa Sigma is founded at the University of Virginia.
The Wyoming territorial legislature gives women the right to vote, one of the first such laws in the world.

Undated
 The H. J. Heinz Company is founded as Heinz Noble & Company in Sharpsburg, Pennsylvania.
 James Gordon Bennett, Jr. of the New York Herald asks Henry Morton Stanley to find Dr. Livingstone.
 Marcus Jastrow arrives in the United States to become rabbi of Congregation Rodeph Shalom in Philadelphia.

Ongoing
 Reconstruction era (1865–1877)
 Gilded Age (1869–c. 1896)

Sport  
November 6 – College of New Jersey (Princeton) defeat the Rutgers Queensmen (Rutgers) 6 to 4 in New Brunswick, N.J. in what is widely considered the first ever American Football game with Rutgers, The State University of New Jersey, becoming known as "The Birthplace of College Football"

Births
 January 4 – Tommy Corcoran, baseball player (died 1960)
 January 10 – Rachel Davis Harris, African American librarian (died 1969)
 February 2 – Smith W. Brookhart, U.S. Senator from Iowa from 1922 to 1926 (died 1944)
 February 19 – Frederic C. Walcott, U.S. Senator from Connecticut from 1929 to 1935 (died 1949)
 February 29 – Thomas Walter Bickett, governor of North Carolina (died 1921)
 April 2 – Hughie Jennings, baseball player (died 1928)
 April 4 – Mary Colter, architect (died 1958)
 April 6 – John W. Brady, Texas judge and murderer (died 1943)
 April 8 – Harvey Cushing, neurosurgeon (died 1939)
 April 9 – James Thomas Heflin, U.S. Senator from Alabama from 1920 to 1931 (died 1951)
 May 3 – Warren Terhune, U.S. Navy Commander and 13th Governor of American Samoa (died 1920)
 May 23 – Olivia Ward Bush-Banks, poet and journalist (died 1944)
 June 10 – William Kenyon, U.S. Senator from Iowa from 1909 to 1922 (died 1933)
 July 14 – Bruno Albert Forsterer, Marine Sergeant, Medal of Honor recipient (died 1957)
 July 17 – Mariette Rheiner Garner, wife of John Nance Garner, Second Lady of the United States (died 1948)
 July 20 – Howard Thurston, stage magician (died 1936)
 August 5 – J. C. W. Beckham, U.S. Senator from Kentucky from 1915 to 1921 (died 1940)
 August 9 – Annie Malone, née Turnbo, African American millionaire businesswoman, inventor and philanthropist (died 1957)
 September 11 – Charles Kilpatrick, one-legged trick cyclist (died 1927)
 November 20 – Alma Webster Hall Powell, opera singer, suffragist, and inventor (died 1930)
 December 16 – Bertha Lamme, electrical engineer (died 1943)
 December 22 
 Nathan Paine, lumber baron (died 1947)
 Edwin Arlington Robinson, poet (died 1935)

Deaths
 January 1 – Martin W. Bates, U.S. Senator from Delaware from 1857 to 1859 (born 1786)
 January 11 – Sophia Dallas, wife of George M. Dallas, Second Lady of the United States (born 1798)
 February 18 – Walker Brooke, U.S. Senator from Mississippi from 1852 to 1853 (born 1813)
 March 13 – James Guthrie, U.S. Senator from Kentucky from 1865 to 1868 (born 1792)
 April 13 – Isaiah Rogers, architect (born 1800)
 May 23 – Alexander O. Anderson, U.S. Senator from Tennessee from 1840 to 1841 (born 1794)
 July 18 – Laurent Clerc, advocate for the deaf (born 1785)
 July 22 – John A. Roebling, bridge engineer (born 1806 in Prussia)
 July 30 – Isaac Toucey, U.S. Senator from Connecticut from 1851 to 1857 (born 1792)
 August 6 – David J. Baker, U.S. Senator from Illinois in 1830 (born 1792)
 September 10 – John Bell, U.S. Senator from Tennessee from 1847 to 1859 (born 1796)
 October 8 – Franklin Pierce, 14th President of the United States from 1853 to 1857 (born 1804)
 October 15 – William Hamlin, engraver (born 1772 in Rhode Island)
 November 11 – Hiram Bingham I, missionary to Hawaii (born 1789)
 November 21 – Benjamin Fitzpatrick, U.S. Senator from Alabama from 1848 to 1849 and 1853 to 1861 (born 1802)
 December 18 – Louis Moreau Gottschalk, composer and pianist (born 1829)
 December 24 – Edwin Stanton, 27th United States Secretary of War (born 1814)
 Sandy Cornish, freed slave and farmer (born 1793)

See also
Timeline of United States history (1860–1899)

Further reading

External links
 

 
1860s in the United States
United States
United States
Years of the 19th century in the United States